René Marcel Gerald Anthony Heyde (born ) is a former New Zealand track cyclist. He won the bronze medal in the men's 4000 m team pursuit, alongside Paul Brydon, Russell Nant and Blair Stockwell, at the 1974 British Commonwealth Games in Christchurch. At those games, he also competed in the men's 1 km time trial, recording a time of 1:12.16 to finish fourth, 0.01 s behind the bronze medallist, Ian Hallam.

References

Year of birth uncertain
1950s births
Living people
Cyclists from Christchurch
New Zealand male cyclists
Commonwealth Games bronze medallists for New Zealand
Commonwealth Games medallists in cycling
Cyclists at the 1974 British Commonwealth Games
20th-century New Zealand people
21st-century New Zealand people
Medallists at the 1974 British Commonwealth Games